The 128th Pennsylvania Volunteer Infantry was an infantry regiment that served in the Union Army during the American Civil War.

Service
The 128th Pennsylvania Infantry was organized at Camp Curtin near Harrisburg, Pennsylvania, and mustered in August 14, 1862 under the command of Colonel Samuel Croasdale.

The regiment was attached to 1st Brigade, 1st Division, XII Corps, Army of the Potomac.

The 128th Pennsylvania Infantry mustered out May 19, 1863.

Detailed service
Left Pennsylvania for Washington, D.C., August 16, and duty there until September 6. Moved to Frederick, Md., September 6–14. Battle of Antietam, Md., September 16–17. At Sandy Hook and Maryland Heights September 22 to December 10. Moved to Fairfax Station, Va., December 10–14. Duty there until January 19, 1863. Moved to Stafford Court House January 19–23, and duty there until April 27. Chancellorsville Campaign April 27 – May 6. Battle of Chancellorsville May 1–5.

Casualties
The regiment lost a total of 59 men during service; 2 officers and 31 enlisted men killed or mortally wounded, 26 enlisted men died of disease. More than half the regiment was surrounded and captured at the Battle of Chancellorsville (9 officers and 225 men).

Commanders
 Colonel Samuel Croasdale – killed in action at the Battle of Antietam
 Colonel Joseph A. Mathews – captured at the Battle of Chancellorsville
 Lieutenant Colonel William W. Hammersly – commanded at the Battle of Antietam after Col. Croasdale was killed in action until wounded in action; resigned January 1863 due to his wounds received at Antietam
 Major Joel B. Wanner – commanded at the Battle of Antietam after Ltc. Hammersly was wounded in action

Notable members
 Corporal Ignatz Gresser, Company D – Medal of Honor recipient for action at the Battle of Antietam

See also

 List of Pennsylvania Civil War Units
 Pennsylvania in the Civil War

References
 Biles, Daniel V. A Soldier's Journey: An Account of Private Isaac Bobst, 128th Pennsylvania Volunteer Infantry and 1st Pennsylvania Cavalry, from Antietam to Andersonville (Gettysburg, PA: Thomas Publications), 1990. 
 Dyer, Frederick H. A Compendium of the War of the Rebellion (Des Moines, IA: Dyer Pub. Co.), 1908.
 Nicholas, Alexander F. Second Brigade of the Pennsylvania Reserves at Antietam (Harrisburg, PA: Harrisburg Pub. Co.), 1908.
Attribution

External links
 National flag of the 128th Pennsylvania Infantry
 128th Pennsylvania Infantry monument at Antietam Battlefield

Military units and formations established in 1862
Military units and formations disestablished in 1863
Units and formations of the Union Army from Pennsylvania